The quokka (Setonix brachyurus) is a small macropod about the size of a domestic cat. It is the only member of the genus Setonix. Like other marsupials in the macropod family (such as kangaroos and wallabies), the quokka is herbivorous and mainly nocturnal.

Quokkas are found on some smaller islands off the coast of Western Australia, particularly Rottnest Island just off Perth and Bald Island near Albany. Isolated, scattered populations also exist in forest and coastal heath between Perth and Albany. A small colony inhabits a protected area of Two Peoples Bay Nature Reserve, where they co-exist with the critically endangered Gilbert's potoroo.

Description 
It has a stocky build, well developed hind legs, rounded ears, and a short, broad head. Its musculoskeletal system was originally adapted for terrestrial bipedal saltation, but over its evolution, its system has been built for arboreal locomotion. Its coarse fur is a grizzled brown colour, fading to buff underneath. The quokka is known to live for an average of 10 years. Quokkas are nocturnal animals; they sleep during the day in Acanthocarpus preissii, using the plants' spikes for protection and hiding.

Quokkas have a promiscuous mating system. After a month of gestation, females give birth to a single baby called a joey. Females can give birth twice a year and produce about 17 joeys during their lifespan. The joey lives in its mother's pouch for six months. Once it leaves the pouch, the joey relies on its mother for milk for two more months and is fully weaned around eight months after birth. Females sexually mature after roughly 18 months. When a female quokka with a joey in her pouch is pursued by a predator, she may drop her baby onto the ground; the joey produces noises which may serve to attract the predator's attention, while the mother escapes.

Discovery and name 

The word "quokka" is originally derived from a Noongar word, which was probably . Today, the Noongar people refer to them as ban-gup, bungeup and quak –a. 

In 1658, Dutch mariner Samuel Volckertzoon wrote of sighting "a wild cat" on the island. In 1696, Dutch explorer Willem de Vlamingh mistook them for giant rats, and renamed the Wadjemup island , which means "the rat nest island" in Dutch.

Ecology 
During the Pleistocene period, quokkas were more abundant and living on open landscapes. When the Europeans arrived in Australia, they introduced new species, some of which became predators to the quokkas. This caused the habitats of quokkas to eventually shift to islands and forests, where there were minimal predators and more vegetation. In the wild, the quokka's roaming is restricted to a very small range in the South West of Western Australia, with a number of small scattered populations. One large population exists on Rottnest Island and a smaller population is on Bald Island near Albany. The islands are free of certain predators such as red foxes and cats. On Rottnest, quokkas are common and occupy a variety of habitats, ranging from semiarid scrub to cultivated gardens.
Prickly Acanthocarpus plants, which are unaccommodating for humans and other relatively large animals to walk through, provide their favorite daytime shelter for sleeping. Additionally, they are known for their ability to climb trees.

Diet 
Like most macropods, quokkas eat many types of vegetation, including grasses, sedges and leaves. A study found that Guichenotia ledifolia, a small shrub species of the family Malvaceae, is one of the quokka's favoured foods. Rottnest Island visitors are urged to never feed quokkas, in part because eating "human food" such as chips can cause dehydration and malnourishment, both of which are detrimental to the quokka's health. Despite the relative lack of fresh water on Rottnest Island, quokkas do have high water requirements, which they satisfy mostly through eating vegetation. On the mainland, quokkas only live in areas that have  or more of rain per year. The quokkas chew their cud, similar to cows.

Population 

Despite being numerous on the small, offshore islands, the quokka is classified as vulnerable. On the mainland, where it is threatened by introduced predatory species such as red foxes, cats, and dogs, it requires dense ground cover for refuge. Clearfell logging, agricultural development, and housing expansion have reduced their habitat, contributing to the decline of the species, as has the clearing and burning of the remaining swamplands. Moreover, quokkas usually have a litter size of one and successfully rear one young each year. Although they are constantly mating, usually one day after the young are born, the small litter size, along with the restricted space and threatening predators, contributes to the scarcity of the species on the mainland.

An estimated 4,000 quokkas live on the mainland, with nearly all mainland populations being groups of fewer than 50, although one declining group of over 700 occurs in the southern forest between Nannup and Denmark. In 2015, an extensive bushfire near Northcliffe nearly eradicated one of the local mainland populations, with an estimated 90% of the 500 quokkas dying.

In 2007, the quokka population on Rottnest Island was estimated at between 8,000 and 12,000. Snakes are the quokka's only predator on the island. The population on smaller Bald Island, where the quokka has no predators, is 600–1,000. At the end of summer and into autumn, a seasonal decline of quokkas occurs on Rottnest Island, where loss of vegetation and reduction of available surface water can lead to starvation.

This species saw the most significant decline from 1930 to the 1990s, when their distribution was reduced by over half. The quokka markedly declined in its abundance and distribution in the early 1930s, and this tendency has continued till today. Their presence on the mainland has declined to such an extent that they are only found in small groups in bushland surrounding Perth. 

The quokka is now listed as vulnerable in accordance with the IUCN criteria.

Human interaction 

Quokkas have little fear of humans and commonly approach people closely, particularly on Rottnest Island, where they are abundant. Though quokkas are approachable, there are a few dozen cases annually of quokkas biting people, especially children. There are restrictions regarding feeding. It is illegal for members of the public to handle the animals in any way, and feeding, particularly of "human food", is especially discouraged, as they can easily get sick. An infringement notice carrying a $300 fine can be issued by the Rottnest Island Authority for such an offence. The maximum penalty for animal cruelty is a $50,000 fine and a five-year prison sentence. In addition to restrictions on human interactions with quokkas, they have been tested to be potentially harmful to humans with their high salmonella infection rates, especially in the summer heat. This has been proven and experimented by scientists who have taken blood tests on wild quokkas on Rottnest Island.

Quokkas can also be observed at several zoos and wildlife parks around Australia, including Perth Zoo, Taronga Zoo, Wild Life Sydney, and Adelaide Zoo. Physical interaction is generally not permitted without explicit permission from supervising staff.

Quokka behavior in response to human interaction has been examined in zoo environments. One brief study indicated fewer animals remained visible from the visitor paths when the enclosure was an open or walk-through environment. This may have been due to the quokkas acquiring avoidance behavior of visitors, which the authors propose has implications for stress management in their exhibition to the public.

Quokka selfies 

In the mid-2010s, quokkas earned a reputation on the internet as "the world's happiest animals" and symbols of positivity, as frontal photos of their faces make them appear to be smiling (they do not, in fact "smile" in the human sense; this can be attributed to their natural facial structures). Many photos of smiling quokkas have since gone viral, and the "quokka selfie" has become a popular social media trend, with celebrities such as Chris Hemsworth, Shawn Mendes, Margot Robbie, Roger Federer and Kim Donghyuk of iKON taking part in the activity. Tourist numbers to Rottnest Island have subsequently increased.

See also
 Pademelon

References

Further reading

External links 
 
 
 

Endemic fauna of Southwest Australia
Macropods
Mammals described in 1830
Mammals of Western Australia
Marsupials of Australia
Rottnest Island
Vulnerable fauna of Australia